Qualification for the men's tournament at the 2006 Winter Olympics was determined through the IIHF World Ranking following the 2004 Men's World Ice Hockey Championships.  The top eight teams in the World Ranking received automatic berths into the Olympics, Italy received a berth as the host, while all other teams had an opportunity to qualify for the remaining three spots in the Olympics through qualifying tournaments.

Qualified teams

Notes

Qualification seeding

Great Britain and South Korea chose not to participate in Olympic qualifying.

Olympic pre-qualification tournaments
Three round-robins were played from 11 to 14 November 2004. The teams seeded 18th, 19th, and 20th reserved the right to host these tournaments. The winners of each advanced to the final qualification tournaments.

Group D
Games were played in Briançon, France.

Group E
Games were played in Nowy Targ, Poland.

Group F
Games were played in Stavanger, Norway.

Final Qualification Tournaments
Three round-robins were played from 10 to 13 February 2005. The teams seeded 9th, 10th and 11th reserved the right to host these tournaments. The three group winners qualified for the Olympic tournament.

Group A
Games were played in Kloten, Switzerland.

Group B
Games were played in Riga, Latvia.

Group C
Games were played in Klagenfurt, Austria.

References

External links
Results at Passion Hockey.com
Qualifier Results at IIHF.com
World Ice Hockey Championships 2003
World Ice Hockey Championships 2004
World Ice Hockey Championships 2001
World Ice Hockey Championships 2002
Official 2002 Olympic results 

Mens